Foshchevatovo is a rural locality (a selo) in Volokonovsky District, Belgorod Oblast, Russia. The population was 1,225 as of 2010. There are 15 streets.

Geography 
Foshchevatovo is located 18 km southeast of Volokonovka (the district's administrative centre) by road. Khmelevets is the nearest rural locality.

References 

Rural localities in Volokonovsky District